The Eddie Cochran Memorial Album is the second album by Eddie Cochran, released on Liberty Records in mono, LRP 3172, in May 1960. It had previously been issued as 12 of His Biggest Hits in April 1960 with the same catalogue number, but after Cochran's death on April 17 it was retitled and reissued, and has remained so titled ever since. It is currently in print on the Magic Records label in France, on CD on EMI-Toshiba in Japan, and on BGO in the UK as a twofer with "Singin' To My Baby."

Content
Eight tracks were released as singles, with "Three Steps to Heaven" appearing as a b-side. Three additional tracks "Have I Told You Lately That I Love You," "Lovin' Time," and "Tell Me Why" had been released on his first album, Singin' to My Baby in 1957. All five singles that appeared on the Billboard Hot 100 are included, with the teen anthem "Summertime Blues" being the only time Cochran made the top ten. No Cochran album has ever charted in the United States.

Personnel
 Eddie Cochran - guitar, ukulele, bass guitar, piano, percussion, vocals
 Mike Henderson, Mike Deasy - saxophone
 Perry Botkin Jr., Sonny Curtis - electric guitar
 Ray Johnson, Jim Stivers - piano
 Connie "Guybo" Smith - double bass, bass guitar
 Dave Shriver - bass
 Earl Palmer, Gene Riggio, Jerry Allison - drums
 Jerry Capehart, Sharon Sheeley - percussion
 The Johnny Mann Chorus - backing vocals

Track listing

Chart positions from Billboard Hot 100; all catalogue numbers Liberty Records.

Side one

Side two

Notes

External links

Eddie Cochran albums
1960 compilation albums
Albums produced by Snuff Garrett
Liberty Records compilation albums